Guy Abeille is a French economist. He is credited with developing the "3% rule" as applied to government deficit ceiling in France, which was later expanded to the Eurozone.

Early life
Guy Abeille graduated from Ecole Nationale de la Statistique in Paris.

Career
Abeille first worked for the Ministry of Economy and Finance under conservative President Valéry Giscard d'Estaing.

In the late 70s and early 80s Abeille was part of the National Budget Office of the Ministry of Finance where he was responsible for budget forecasting. In 1981 after François Mitterrand came to power, he and fellow economist Roland de Villepin were asked to establish a risk-based criteria for fiscal deficit ceiling by the deputy head of the National Budget Office, Pierre Biger. Abeille and Villepin are thus credited with creating the "3% rule" whereby the French deficit must not exceed 3% of the country's Gross Domestic Product.

The 3% rule was later incorporated into the Maastricht criteria, which establishes the requirements potential member states should meet to enter the third stage of the Eurozone and adopt the euro as their currency. The rule has been maintained through all subsequent treaties of the Monetary Union, including the Stability and Growth Pact and the European Fiscal Compact.

References

Living people
ENSTA Paris alumni
20th-century French economists
21st-century French economists
Year of birth missing (living people)